Manab Deka is a member of the Assam Legislative Assembly, in India, for the BJP, from Lakhimpur constituency, elected in the 2021 election. He won the elections by 70,387 votes, defeating Dr. Joy Prakash Das from Congress.

References

Living people
Assam MLAs 2021–2026
Bharatiya Janata Party politicians from Assam
1976 births